Anton Mihaylov Nedyalkov (born 30 April 1993) is a Bulgarian professional footballer who plays as a left-back and centre-back for Ludogorets Razgrad and the Bulgarian national team.

Nedyalkov began his professional career at Litex Lovech in 2011. After loan spells at Chavdar Etropole and Svetkavitsa he became a regular in their team, playing 85 total games for Litex. In June 2016, he joined CSKA Sofia and became an integral member of the team. In December 2017, he briefly signed for Major League Soccer club FC Dallas before joining Ludogorets six months later.

Formerly an international at under-19 and under-21 level, Nedyalkov made his senior international debut for Bulgaria against Luxembourg on 6 September 2016.

Career

Litex Lovech 

Nedyalkov joined the first team in 2012 after two loan spells at Chavdar Etropole and Svetkavitsa during the 2011/12 season.

CSKA Sofia 
In June 2016, Nedyalkov joined CSKA Sofia. He made his debut on 29 July, in a 2–0 home win over Slavia Sofia which was also the season opener. In his first season with CSKA, he appeared in 34 of 36 league matches; in 33 of them Nedyalkov played full 90 minutes. After a number of good games he was chosen as the best player of the 2016–17 season by the club's fans.

FC Dallas 
On 21 December 2017, Nedyalkov completed a move to Major League Soccer club FC Dallas for a fee of $1.5 million plus bonuses. He was given the number 6 shirt. Nedyalkov made his league debut in a 3–0 home win at Toyota Stadium against Seattle Sounders on 18 March 2018, playing full 90 minutes as a left-back. He assisted Roland Lamah for the third goal in the game.

Ludogorets Razgrad
On 23 June 2018, after just 6 months in the United States, Dallas announced that Nedyalkov would return to Bulgaria and sign a contract with Bulgarian champions Ludogorets Razgrad for an undisclosed fee. Later that day Ludogorets officially announced the transfer of Nedyalkov, signing with his favorite number 3 shirt.
On 23 June 2021 Nedyalkov was announced as the new captain of the team, after Svetoslav Dyakov left the club.

International career
In 2011, he was a member of Bulgaria U-19 team, playing three games in the qualifying round of U-19 European Championship.
Nedyalkov was called up to the senior Bulgaria team for friendlies against Portugal and Macedonia in March 2016. On 6 September 2016, he made his debut for Bulgaria in a 4-3 2018 World Cup Qualifying victory over Luxembourg.

Career statistics

Club

National team

Honours
Ludogorets Razgrad 
Bulgarian First League (4): 2018–19, 2019–20, 2020–21, 2021–22
Bulgarian Supercup (3): 2019, 2021, 2022

Individual
 Best defender in the  Bulgarian First League: 2019
 2nd place in the  Bulgarian Footballer of the Year ranking - 2019

References

Living people
1993 births
People from Lovech
Bulgarian footballers
Bulgaria youth international footballers
Bulgaria under-21 international footballers
Bulgaria international footballers
Association football fullbacks
PFC Litex Lovech players
FC Chavdar Etropole players
PFC Svetkavitsa players
PFC CSKA Sofia players
PFC Ludogorets Razgrad players
First Professional Football League (Bulgaria) players
Second Professional Football League (Bulgaria) players
FC Dallas players
Bulgarian expatriate footballers
Bulgarian expatriate sportspeople in the United States
Expatriate soccer players in the United States
Major League Soccer players